Gemunu may refer to
Gemunu Watch, an infantry regiment of the Sri Lanka Army 
Gemunu Kulatunge, Sri Lankan general
Gemunu Wijesuriya, Sri Lankan broadcaster, comedian, singer and radio producer 
Maharaja Gemunu, a 2015 Sri Lankan film 
Cnemaspis gemunu, a species of gecko endemic to Sri Lanka 

Sinhalese masculine given names